Fort Bayard may refer to:

 Fort-Bayard, the city of Zhanjiang in Guangdong province, China
 Fort Bayard, New Mexico, an unincorporated community, United States
 Fort Bayard Historic District, a frontier fort in New Mexico, United States
 Fort Bayard National Cemetery, at Fort Bayard, New Mexico, United States
 Fort Bayard (Washington, D.C.), a fort in Washington D.C., United States